Houghton Lake is an unincorporated community and census-designated place (CDP) in Roscommon County in the U.S. state of Michigan. The CDP is located within Denton, Lake, and Roscommon townships. The population was 5,294 at the time of the 2020 census.

The CDP is situated on the southwest shore of Houghton Lake, which at 22,000 acres is Michigan's largest inland lake, and also includes the unincorporated community of Houghton Lake Heights. The community of Prudenville borders on the east. M-55 runs through the communities, and U.S. Route 127 is the western boundary of the Houghton Lake CDP.

History

The Houghton Lake area's first white settlers were said to be the Emery family in 1873. Augustus Emery, his wife, and their 7 children left their home in Chesaning, Michigan, and made their way on foot to an area three miles south of the lake via the well-known Saginaw Trail. It was here that Mr. Emery and his three sons, Augustus, Jr., 21, William, 19, and Harvey, 17, would construct the family home on 160 acres of homesteaded property.

Lumbering had a profound impact on the early development of Houghton Lake. In the mid-1800s, lumber camps in the area were abundant, and roads, towns, and railways were established to support the lumber trade. Logs were floated from Houghton Lake down the Muskegon River to sawmills and shipping facilities in Muskegon. It has been estimated that in 1860 alone, mills on the Muskegon River produced 75,000,000 board-feet of lumber.

By the late 1800s, lumbering became the primary industry in the area. As lumber camps sprung up around saw mills, more settlers arrived. Around 1883, a community at Houghton Lake had been created.

Houghton Lake was originally called "Roscommon Lake". However, in 1879, after the untimely death of famous physician, explorer, and Michigan's first state geologist, Douglass Houghton, Roscommon Lake was honorably renamed Houghton Lake.

With the decline of the lumbering industry in the early 1900s, railways that had been used to transport lumber were transformed to passenger lines to bring outdoorsmen to fish, hunt, and experience the beauty of the "north country". The Houghton Lake fishery became legendary and attracted visitors from far and wide.

By the mid-1900s Houghton Lake had become known as a prime resort area. Today, thousands of seasonal cottages, year-round homes, and businesses border the lake. Houghton Lake remains one of Michigan's top resort and vacation destinations and attracts thousands of visitors to its shores each year.

In 1927, the "Johnson Dance Hall," presently known as "The Playhouse," was erected and served for many years as the entertainment center for the area. The Playhouse and the surrounding property are now home to The Houghton Lake Historical Society, as well as the yearly event "Historic Village Days"

The town was struck by a windstorm on June 11, 1932, which killed four people. During a snowstorm that caused reduced visibility, two married couples died when they drove their cars into the frozen lake on New Year's Day, 1957. The Limberlost Hotel, situated on the shore of Houghton Lake, was destroyed by a fire in 1968 causing one injury but no deaths.<ref>"Houghton Lake Hotel Burns."The Owosso Argus-Press. September 3. 1968. p 14 Web March 29. 2011</ref> Two men drowned in a snowmobile accident during a carnival on the frozen lake in 1980.

Geography

Climate

Demographics

As of the census of 2000, there were 3,749 people, 1,646 households, and 1,030 families residing in the CDP. The racial makeup of the CDP was 97.95% White, 0.35% African American, 0.64% Native American, 0.19% Asian, 0.03% Pacific Islander, 0.13% from other races, and 0.72% from two or more races. Hispanic or Latino of any race were 0.91% of the population.

There were 1,646 households, out of which 23.9% had children under the age of 18 living with them, 49.7% were married couples living together, 9.2% had a female householder with no husband present, and 37.4% were non-families. 32.1% of all households were made up of individuals, and 14.5% had someone living alone who was 65 years of age or older. The average household size was 2.23 and the average family size was 2.78.

In the CDP, the population was spread out, with 21.4% under the age of 18, 6.7% from 18 to 24, 23.3% from 25 to 44, 26.7% from 45 to 64, and 21.8% who were 65 years of age or older. The median age was 44 years. For every 100 females, there were 89.7 males. For every 100 females age 18 and over, there were 89.5 males.

The median income for a household in the CDP was $27,443, and the median income for a family was $30,735. Males had a median income of $23,346 versus $16,111 for females. The per capita income for the CDP was $16,862. About 10.2% of families and 16.0% of the population were below the poverty line, including 18.6% of those under age 18 and 7.7% of those age 65 or over.

Transportation
Bus
Indian Trails provides daily intercity bus service between St. Ignace and East Lansing, Michigan.
Greyhound Lines provides daily bus service to the Greyhound network from Houghton Lake. 

Major highways
 runs north to south, west of Houghton Lake. The highway begins at I-75 south of Grayling, and runs into central and southern Michigan via the cities of Mt. Pleasant, Lansing, and Jackson, before entering Ohio.
 runs east and west through Houghton Lake. The highway begins near Lake Michigan in Manistee, and runs east through Cadillac and Lake City before entering Houghton Lake. The highway continues eastward through nearby Prudenville and into West Branch before ending near Lake Huron in Tawas City.

Airport
 Houghton Lake State Airport is located in the northwest corner of Houghton Lake near the intersection of M-55 and Old U.S. Highway 27.

 Public transit 

 Roscommon County Transportation Authority. Provides bus service anywhere in Roscommon County door-to-door for a maximum fee of $3.00 per ride, one-way, and as low as $.75 each way for students and senior citizens.  

Recreation

Tip Up Town USA
Houghton Lake is home to Tip Up Town USA, Michigan’s oldest-running and largest winter festival. Tip Up Town has events throughout the month of January starting with a kick off and ending with a polar plunge. All of these events are included with the purchase of a 10 dollar badge, and children under 5 are free. These are sold at many local businesses as well as the Chamber of Commerce. The events start with the Tip Up Town Kick Off held at the Houghton Lake Playhouse. At the kick off, there are auctions for the first 10 Tip Up Town badges, first 10 polar bear dippers, and several signature tip ups. The event ends with the campaigns and voting for the Queen, Mayor, and Marshal. The following weekend is the fundraiser at Shenanigan’s Pub and Grub where items donated by many local businesses are auctioned off. The third and fourth weekend in January is the main event. The weekend starts off with a parade through town ending at the site which is the DNR boat launch by the Pines Theater. The two weekends are packed with family fun such as ice fishing, egg tosses, pie eating, hula hoop contests, carnival rides, snowmobile drag races, and so much more. For the adults, there is an adult beverage tent, snowmobile and side by side races, beard and antique snowmobile contests. Tip Up Town ends with a splash at the Polar Bear Dip. Tip Up Town is a month full of fun that brings a lot of much needed business to the Houghton Lake area.

For more information about Tip Up Town you can go to https://www.houghtonlakechamber.net/tip-up-town-usa/

 Fishing 
At 22,000 acres, Houghton Lake is Michigan's largest inland lake and has been called a "Fish Factory" by many sources.  It is relatively shallow with a maximum depth of 24 feet and heavy weed bed cover, making an ideal fish habitat. There are 7 public access sites evenly distributed around the lake for easy access, as well as a good number of supporting businesses like bait and tackle shops, marinas, and boat dealers for fishermen.

 Golf 
There are three golf courses in Houghton Lake. They are:

 Pine View Highlands, which has won several awards, including “One Of The Gems Of The North” by The Detroit News, “One Of The Top Picks Of Michigan Courses” by AAA Michigan Living Magazine, and “#1 People’s Choice Award” by Roscommon County
 The Quest Golf Club, a championship course designed by PGA professional Ken Green.
 White Deer Country Club
 Historic Village Days 
A weekend event takes place at the Historic Playhouse and the recreated village featuring 13 historical buildings that have been restored or rebuilt to reflect life in the logging-era of the late 1800s. A museum is housed in a hand-hewn log school house that was built in 1876. The village also features, as of August 2012, a General Store, Chapel, Cook Shack, Print Shop, Barber Shop / Pharmacy / Doctor's Office, Blacksmith, Dress Shop, Town Hall, Carriage Shop, and two homes.

Historic Village Days features many events and activities, from educational to recreational. Popular events and activities include a Pig Roast, Live Music (2012's music included a dulcimer band and a barbershop quartet), Liar's Contest, Story Telling, and more.

The Village is open every Friday and Saturday in June, July and August from 12-4, and Historic Village Days event takes place the first weekend in August.

 Arts and crafts shows 
Shows take place on Houghton Lake Middle School grounds in Houghton Lake on various dates throughout the year. The Houghton Lake Arts & Crafts Shows features artists & vendors with a wide variety of items for sale.

As of July 2013, the shows take place on weekends around Memorial Day, July 4 (the "Summer Show"), and Labor Day.

 Pumpkin Run 
Car cruises, car shows, antique, classic, and vintage vehicles, competitions, DJ, karaoke, and more.Houghton Lake Area Tourism & Convention BureauHoughton Lake Events Calendar

References

Further reading
 Carman, Bulah. Capsules of Time: A Saga of Houghton Lake''. Houghton Lake, Mich.: Bankov Printing, 1987.

Unincorporated communities in Roscommon County, Michigan
Census-designated places in Michigan
Unincorporated communities in Michigan
Census-designated places in Roscommon County, Michigan
Populated places established in 1873
1873 establishments in Michigan